The Dordrecht Confession of Faith is a statement of religious beliefs adopted by Dutch Mennonite leaders at a meeting in Dordrecht, the Netherlands, on 21 April 1632. Its 18 articles emphasize belief in salvation through Jesus Christ, baptism, nonviolence (non-resistance), withdrawing from, or shunning those who are excommunicated from the Church, feet washing ("a washing of the saints' feet"), and avoidance of taking oaths. 

It was an influential part of the Radical Reformation and remains an important religious document to many modern Anabaptist groups, such as the Amish. In 1725, Jacob Gottschalk, a Mennonite bishop, met with sixteen other ministers from southeastern Pennsylvania and adopted the Confession. They also wrote the following endorsement, which Gottschalk was the first to sign:
We the hereunder written Servants of the Word of God, and Elders in the Congregation of the People, called Mennonists, in the Province of Pennsylvania, do acknowledge, and herewith make known, that we do own the foregoing Confession, Appendix, and Menno's Excusation, to be according to our Opinion; and also, have took the same to be wholly ours. In Testimony whereof, and that we believe that same to be good, we have here unto Subscribed our Names.

See also
Conservative Mennonites
Old Colony Mennonites
Old Order Mennonites

References

External links

Mennolink article on confessions of faith
Dordrecht Confession of Faith translation and context in Global Anabaptist Mennonite Encyclopedia Online

Anabaptist statements of faith
Mennonitism in the Netherlands
Christianity in the Dutch Republic
17th-century Christian texts